Dmitri Alekseyevich Ivanov (born 17 September 1970) is a Russian professional football coach and a former player. He is an assistant coach with FC Olimpia Volgograd.

Club career
He made his professional debut in the Soviet Second League in 1987 for FC Torpedo Volzhsky. He played 2 games in the UEFA Intertoto Cup 2000 for FC Rostselmash Rostov-on-Don.

Honours
 Russian Cup finalist: 1995 (played in the early stages of the 1994/95 tournament for FC Rotor Volgograd).

References

1970 births
Sportspeople from Samara, Russia
Living people
Soviet footballers
Russian footballers
Association football midfielders
FC Energiya Volzhsky players
FC Tekstilshchik Kamyshin players
PFC Krylia Sovetov Samara players
FC Torpedo Moscow players
FC Torpedo-2 players
FC Rotor Volgograd players
FC Elista players
FC Rostov players
FC Rubin Kazan players
FC Olimpia Volgograd players
Russian Premier League players
FC Yenisey Krasnoyarsk players